The 2016 Atlantic Coast Conference women's basketball tournament was the postseason women's basketball tournament for the Atlantic Coast Conference held March 2–6, 2016, in Greensboro, North Carolina, at the Greensboro Coliseum. Notre Dame won their 3rd straight ACC tournament title to earn an automatic trip to the NCAA women's tournament.

Seeding
Tournament seeds are determined by teams' regular season conference record with tiebreakers determined by ACC tiebreaking rules.

Schedule

Bracket

Awards and honors

See also
 2016 ACC men's basketball tournament

References

2015–16 Atlantic Coast Conference women's basketball season
ACC women's basketball tournament
Basketball competitions in Greensboro, North Carolina
Women's sports in North Carolina
College sports in North Carolina
2016 in sports in North Carolina